Edward Griffiths (17 March 1862 – 20 April 1893) was an English cricketer. He played for Gloucestershire between 1885 and 1889.

References

1862 births
1893 deaths
English cricketers
Gloucestershire cricketers
People from Winchcombe
Sportspeople from Gloucestershire